A constitution (or governing document) is the set of regulations which govern the conduct of non-political entities, whether incorporated or not. Such entities include corporations and voluntary associations.

See also
Corporate governance
Articles of association
Memorandum of association
Corporate law